This is a list of episodes for the television series The Mod Squad.

Series overview

Episodes

Season 1 (1968–69)

Season 2 (1969–70)

Season 3 (1970–71)

Season 4 (1971–72)

Season 5 (1972–73)

Television film (1979)

Home releases
The entire series has been released on DVD, in the following box sets:

References

External links
 
 
 
 Episode guide at Chezgrae.com

Mod Squad